Following are the results of the 2008–09 FC Dynamo Kyiv season.  FC Dynamo Kyiv is a professional football club based in the Ukrainian capital city of Kyiv. Founded in 1927, the club currently participates in the Ukrainian Premier League and has spent its entire history in the top league of Soviet and later Ukrainian football. Dynamo Kyiv has won thirteen league titles, nine Ukrainian Cups, one UEFA Super Cup and two UEFA Cup Winners' Cups, and played three times in the semi-final of the UEFA Champions League.

Key Dates 
Dates to be added as season goes on

Squad

First-team squad 
Updated 7 September 2008

Reserve and Youth Squad

UEFA Champions League Squad

Transfers

In

Out

Loaned Out

Statistics

Appearances and goals

Top scorers 
Includes all competitive matches

Club

Coaching staff 
{|class="wikitable"
!Position
!Staff
|-
|Head coach|| Yuri Semin
|-
|rowspan="3"|Assistant coach|| Oleh Luzhnyi
|-
| Sergei Ovchinnikov
|-
| Valeriy Zuyev
|-
|Goalkeeping coach|| Serhiy Krakovskiy
|-
|First team fitness coach|| Vincenzo Pinkolini
|-
|rowspan="2"|Dynamo-2 head coach|| Yuriy Kalitvynstev
|-
| Gennadiy Litovchenko
|-
|Reserve and Youth team coach|| Volodymyr Muntyan
|-
|rowspan="3"|Club doctor|| Victor Berkovskyi
|-
| Volodymyr Maliuta
|-
| Andriy Shmorhun

Competitions

Overall

Pre-season

Ukrainian Premier League

League table

Results by round

Matches

UEFA Champions League

Ukrainian Cup

References

External links 
Dynamo Kyiv Official Website

FC Dynamo Kyiv seasons
Dynamo Kyiv
Ukrainian football championship-winning seasons